Symmocoides is a genus of moths in the family Autostichidae.

Species
Symmocoides don (Gozmány, 1963)
Symmocoides ferreirae Gozmány, 2000
Symmocoides gozmanyi (Amsel, 1959)
Symmocoides marthae (Gozmány, 1957)
Symmocoides margaritis Gozmány, 2008
Symmocoides oxybiella (Millière, 1872)

References

External links
Images representing Symmocoides oxybiella at Consortium for the Barcode of Life